Bhatkhande Sanskriti Vishwavidyalaya (BSV), formerly Bhatkhande Music Institute Deemed University, Bhatkhande College of Hindustani Music and Marris College of Music, is a state university in Lucknow. Established in 1926 by Vishnu Narayan Bhatkhande, it was declared a deemed university by University Grants Commission (UGC) in 2000, and upgraded into a state university in 2022 by The Bhatkhande Sanskriti Vishwavidyalaya Act, 2022. It offers music education in Vocal Music, Instrumental, Rhythms, Dance, Musicology and Research and Applied Music.

History
The Institute finds its origin in the Marris College of Music, established in 1926 by renowned classical singer and musicologist, Vishnu Narayan Bhatkhande and Rai Umanath Bali with the help of Dr. Rai Rajeshwar Bali, then Education minister of the United Provinces, the institution was formally inaugurated by then Governor of United Provinces, Sir William Sinclair Marris, and was also named after him.

Later, on 26 March 1966, the Government of Uttar Pradesh took over the college and renamed it after its founder as Bhatkhande Music College of Hindustani Music, later  and now Bhatkhande Music Institute Deemed University, after Government of India through a notification on 24 October 2000, declared the institute a deemed university.

During the 1970s & 1980s, the institute organized annual festivals in which the most eminent of the country's musicians performed.  Some of the memorable concerts, that included performances by stars like Ravi shankar(Sitar), Amjad Ali Khan, Ustad Zakir Hussain, N Rajam, V.J Jog, Sitara Devi, etc. were part of the Lucknow Festival in the 1970s.  During the same period various new courses, like "Thumri" (singer Mrs. Begum Akhtar was the honorary faculty), were introduced.

In 2005, it organised a three-day classical music festival part of the Lucknow Mahotsav.

Primarily teaching vocal, dance, musicology and applied music in Hindustani classical music, the institute also started teaching western classical music in 2009, a move that didn't go well with some chauvinists (not musicians or affiliated to the Institute), who feared that addition of Western classical music could later lead to replacement of Bharatnatyam courses by 'belly dancing.' 

In 2022 it was upgraded into a teaching and affiliating state University, and name was changed into Bhatkhande Sanskriti Vishwavidyalaya.

Departments
 Vocal (Gayan)- Classical, Semi-Classical and Light Vocal.
 Instrumental (Vadan)
 Swaravadya - Sitar, Sarod, Violin, Guitar, Sarangi, Flute and Harmonium or Keyboard.
 Talavadya - Tabla and Pakhawaj
 Dance (Nritya)
 Kathak, Bharatnatyam, Manipuri dance and Folk dance.
 Musicology & Research
 Applied Music

The institute offers courses in Vocal Music, Instrumental, Rhythms, Dance, Musicology & Research and Applied Music leading up to: Diploma in Music - 2 years, Bachelor of Performing Arts (B.P.A.) - 3 years, Master of Performing Arts (M.P.A.) - 2 years and Ph.D. Apart from this there are special for the training in Dhrupad-Dhamar, Thumri singing and Light classical music which includes music composition and direction.

Notable alumni

Leela Desai
Saraswati Devi, film score composers 
Pt K. G. Ginde - Classical Vocal
Anup Jalota, singer
Anindita Paul, singer, songwriter and composer
V. G. Jog
Kanika Kapoor, singer
Shanno Khurana 
Talat Mahmood, playback singer
W. D. Amaradeva, Sri Lankan Singer
Nanda Malini, Sri Lankan Singer
Sujatha Attanayake, Sri Lankan Singer
Amit Mishra
Dayarathna Ranatunga, Sri Lankan Singer
Sumati Mutatkar
Sanath Nandasiri, Sri Lankan musician
Kalpana Patowary, payback and folk singer
Roshan, film score composer
Sunil Santha, Sri Lankan musician
Pahari Sanyal, Bengali film-actor 
C. R. Vyas
Naushad
Shanti Hiranand
Anurag Bhadouria
Krishna Bose
Neeti Mohan
Malini Awasthi
Anupama Raag
Ustad Julfikar Hussain
Chinmoy Lahiri
Raghunath Seth

Notable faculty
S. N. Ratanjankar, principal
Mohanrao Kallianpurkar
Ahmed Jan Thirakwa
Begum Akhtar
Puru Dadheech
Shruti Sadolikar Katkar
Dr.Purnima Pandey
Dr.Kumkum Dhar
Ustad Abid Hussain

See also
Lucknow College of Arts and Crafts
Bhartendu Academy of Dramatic Arts
Faculty of Architecture (Lucknow)
Indira Kala Sangeet Vishwavidyalaya
Karnataka State Dr. Gangubhai Hangal Music and Performing Arts University
Tamil Nadu Music and Fine Arts University
Raja Mansingh Tomar Music & Arts University
Manipur University of Culture

References

External links
 

Music schools in India
Art schools in India
Dance schools in India
Universities in Uttar Pradesh
Hindustani music organisations
Universities and colleges in Lucknow
Educational institutions established in 1926
Arts organizations established in 1926
1926 establishments in India
Music of Uttar Pradesh